Mandaladeesudu is a 1987 Indian Telugu-language satirical film directed by M. Prabhakar Reddy. The film was made by Krishna amidst the background of his rivalry with fellow actor and then chief minister  of Andhra Pradesh N. T. Rama Rao in cinema and politics, and is meant to satirize the latter, leading to a rather controversial production.

Plot
The famous actor Bhima Rao (a parody of N. T. Rama Rao) shifts to politics, using theatrics, making impossible promises and cutting backroom deals to try to win the election.

Cast
 Kota Srinivasa Rao as Bhima Rao

Production
Mandaladeesudu was made by Krishna during a low point in his relationship with Rama Rao. Having already had a major rivalry in the film industry, their animosity increased after Rama Rao entered politics with the formation of the Telugu Desham Party and eventually became the chief minister of pre-bifurication Andhra Pradesh in 1983, with Krishna entering the Congress Party in response. During this period, Krishna made three films criticizing Rama Rao, with Mandaladeesudu being one of them. Initially, no one "dared" to play Rama Rao, especially leading actors, and even when Kota Srinivasa Rao, considered a "character actor", was cast for the part, he was fearful of the potential backlash.

Reception
According to Rao, he was blacklisted by some directors and producers in the industry that supported NTR after the film's release, and was also involved in an incident where he was confronted and beaten by a mob of Telugu Desam Party supporters at a train station. Posani Krishna Murali has stated that NTR himself actually approved of Rao's performance and went on to say that the character was indistinguishable from him. Rao also stated in a 2021 interview that NTR appreciated his performance, but that his son and fellow actor Balakrishna spat in his face when he encountered him during another film shooting in Rajahmundry sometime during the 1990s. Later on, Jandhyala decided to cast Rao as the miser character Lakshmipathy in the film Aha Naa-Pellanta! based on his acting in Mandaladeesudu despite the initial objections of producer D. Ramanaidu, with both the film and the character becoming a huge success.

References

External links